Edwin Abbott Abbott  (20 December 1838 – 12 October 1926) was an English schoolmaster, theologian, and Anglican priest, best known as the author of the novella Flatland (1884).

Biography 
Edwin Abbott Abbott was the eldest son of Edwin Abbott (1808–1882), headmaster of the Philological School, Marylebone, and his wife, Jane Abbott (1806–1882). His parents were first cousins.

He was born in London and educated at the City of London School and at St John's College, Cambridge, where he took the highest honours of his class in classics, mathematics and theology, and became a fellow of his college. In particular, he was 1st Smith's prizeman in 1861. In 1862 he took orders. After holding masterships at King Edward's School, Birmingham, he succeeded G. F. Mortimer as headmaster of the City of London School in 1865, at the early age of 26. There, he oversaw the education of future Prime Minister H. H. Asquith. Abbott was Hulsean lecturer in 1876.

He retired in 1889, and devoted himself to literary and theological pursuits. Abbott's liberal inclinations in theology were prominent both in his educational views and in his books. His Shakespearian Grammar (1870) is a permanent contribution to English philology. In 1885, he published a life of Francis Bacon. His theological writings include three anonymously published religious romances – Philochristus (1878), where he tried to raise interest in Gospels reading, Onesimus (1882), and Silanus the Christian (1908).

More weighty contributions are the anonymous theological discussion The Kernel and the Husk (1886), Philomythus (1891), his book The Anglican Career of Cardinal Newman (1892), and his article "The Gospels" in the ninth edition of the Encyclopædia Britannica, embodying a critical view which caused considerable stir in the English theological world. He also wrote St Thomas of Canterbury, His Death and Miracles (1898), Johannine Vocabulary (1905), and Johannine Grammar (1906).

Abbott also wrote educational textbooks, one being Via Latina: A First Latin Book which was published in 1880 and distributed around the world within the education system.

Flatland 

Abbott's best-known work is his 1884 novella Flatland: A Romance of Many Dimensions which describes a two-dimensional world and explores the nature of dimensions. It has often been categorized as science fiction although it could more precisely be called "mathematical fiction".

With the advent of modern science fiction from the 1950s to the present day, Flatland has seen a revival in popularity, especially among science fiction and cyberpunk fans. Many works have been inspired by the novella, including novel sequels and short films.

Bibliography 
 Via Latina: A First Latin Book, Including Accidence, Rules of Syntax, Exercises, Vocabularies and Rules for Construing (Seeley, Jackson, and Halliday, revised edition: 1882)
 Shakespearian Grammar: An Attempt to Illustrate Some of the Differences Between Elizabethan and Modern English, for the Use of Schools (Macmillan, 1870)
 Flatland: A Romance of Many Dimensions (Seeley & Co., 1884)
 Francis Bacon: An Account of His Life and Works (Macmillan, 1885)
 Philochristus: Memoirs of a Disciple of the Lord (Macmillan, 1878)
 Onesimus: Memoirs of a Disciple of St. Paul (Macmillan, 1882)
 The Kernel and the Husk (Macmillan, 1886)
 Philomythus: An Antidote Against Credulity (Macmillan, 1891)
 The Anglican Career of John Henry Newman|Cardinal Newman (Macmillan, 1892)
 St Thomas of Canterbury: His Death and Miracles (Adam and Charles Black, 1898)
 Johannine Vocabulary: A Comparison of the Words of the Fourth Gospel with Those of the Three (Adam and Charles Black, 1905)
 Johannine Grammar (Adam and Charles Black, 1906)
 Silanus the Christian (Adam and Charles Black, 1906)
 The FourFold Gospel: or, A Harmony of The Four Gospels in five volumes, 1913-1917
 Volume I: Introduction, 1913

See also 

List of Old Citizens

Explanatory notes

References 

 Dictionary of National Biography

Further reading

External links 

 
 
 
 
 
 

Free audiobook narration of Flatland
Online text of Flatland
Full text of A Shakespearian Grammar on the Tufts University Perseus Digital Library
Thomas Banchoff collection of materials relating to Edwin Abbott Abbott at the Brown University John Hay Library

1838 births
1926 deaths
Alumni of St John's College, Cambridge
Schoolteachers from London
English science fiction writers
19th-century English theologians
20th-century English theologians
English Anglican theologians
People educated at the City of London School
Linguists of English
British Christian theologians
19th-century British novelists
British male novelists
19th-century male writers
Fellows of the British Academy
20th-century English male writers
19th-century Anglican theologians
20th-century Anglican theologians
Fellows of St John's College, Cambridge
19th-century English Anglican priests
20th-century English Anglican priests
People from Marylebone
Mathematics popularizers